Cornus suecica, the dwarf cornel or bunchberry, is a species of flowering plant in the dogwood family Cornaceae, native to cool temperate and subarctic regions of Europe and Asia, and also locally in extreme northeastern and northwestern North America.

Description 
The fruit is a red berry.

Habitat and range 
Cornus suecica is a plant of heaths, moorland and mountains, often growing beneath taller species such as heather (Calluna vulgaris). Its range is nearly circumboreal, but it is absent from the continental centres of Asia and North America. In North America, the species is found in Alaska (U.S.) and British Columbia (Canada), and also eastern Canada (Labrador, New Brunswick, Newfoundland, Nova Scotia, and Quebec), as well as Greenland, but not in the intervening region.

Where Cornus canadensis, a forest species, and Cornus suecica, a heath or bog species, grow near each other in their overlapping ranges in Alaska, Labrador, and Greenland, they can hybridize by cross-pollination, producing plants with intermediate characteristics.

Taxonomy
Cornus suecica is included in the subgenus Arctocrania.

References

External links
 
 
 

suecica
Flora of Subarctic America
Flora of Northern Canada
Flora of Finland
Flora of Alaska
Flora of Northeast Asia
Plants described in 1753
Taxa named by Carl Linnaeus
Flora without expected TNC conservation status